Marián Skupek (born 12 July 2001) is a Slovakian luger who competes internationally.
 
He represented his country at the 2022 Winter Olympics.

References

External links
 
 
 

2001 births
Living people
Slovak male lugers
Olympic lugers of Slovakia
Lugers at the 2022 Winter Olympics
21st-century Slovak people